Parliamentary elections were held in Iran in 1954.  Political parties were banned from contesting the election, and all 136 elected MPs were independents.

The elections were "rigged and far from a legitimate process".

Upper house elections began in February while the lower house elections in provinces began at the same time. Lower house election in Tehran was held on March 9 and 10.

Campaign 
The outlawed opposition formed by the National Front activists after 1953 coup d'état, 'National Resistance Movement' (NRM) put all its effort to campaign for its twelve candidates in Tehran, namely Ahmad Razavi, Abdollah Moazzami, Allahyar Saleh, Ali Shayegan, Kazem Hassibi, Mohammad-Ali Angaji, Mahmoud Nariman, Karim Sanjabi, Bagher Jalali Mousavi, Asghar Parsa, Ahmad Akhgar and Ahmad Zirakzadeh, of whom some were in hiding. However, they could not rely on a vast network of activists because of suffering from organizational weakness. To distribute NRM statements in Tehran, Bazargan and Bakhtiar had to take taxi and throw the paper out of the window and speak in French to conceal their identity and purpose from the driver. Bazargan organized some 2,000 nationalists to vote in Sepahsalar Mosque, however they were barred from casting their vote by the security forces, the čāqukeš led by Shaban Jafari and fascist organizations like SUMKA, who were present in the streets.

Results 
 In Tehran, all 12 winners declared were pro-Shah candidates led by Ja'far Behbahani. A seat was also given to Mohammad Derakhshesh, a trade unionist and chairman of Teachers Association.

Media coverage

In the United States 
The New York Times wrote that a voter bowed three times to the ballot box and when asked why, he said "I am merely making my obeisance to the magic box. When one drops in a ballot for Mohammad [Mosaddeq], lo, when the ballot is opened it is transformed into a vote for Fazlollah [Zahedi]".

Time magazine reported:

References

1954 elections in Asia
1954 in Iran
Non-partisan elections
Iranian Senate elections
National Consultative Assembly elections
Electoral fraud in Iran
Lower house elections in Iran